This is a list of Oregon Ducks football players in the NFL draft.

Key

Selections

Notable undrafted players

References

Oregon

Oregon Ducks NFL draft